The Galician Language Association (AGAL) is a reintegrationist association established in 1981 which seeks the full restoration ("re-integration") of Galician as a branch of Galician-Portuguese. It also aims for the official incorporation of Galicia into the Community of Portuguese Language Countries. It was originally formed by professional linguists only, although membership was soon made available to individuals showing an interest in the promotion of Galician culture, language, and the ideas of linguistic reintegrationism.

History and theoretical foundations

AGAL made its name in the public domain in 1983, when its Comissom Lingüística (Linguistic Commission) passed a new set of rules and norms for the Galician language with the title Estudo crítico das «Normas Ortográficas e Morfolóxicas do Idioma Galego» ("Critical study of 'Galician Language Spelling and Morphological Rules'"). This study radically diverged from the norms of the Real Academia Galega (Royal Galician Academy) published in 1982. The AGAL norm was somewhat based in the 1979 official draft for the Galician language prepared under the direction of professor Carvalho Calero. With the dismissal of Carvalho Calero due to political reasons and the subsequent approval of a different set of spelling norms the debate between isolationists and reintegrationists (led by AGAL) was ignited.

AGAL considers that "Galician" is the denomination that Galician-Portuguese language should receive in Galicia, and assumes that the international name is Portuguese. Following the reintegracionist ideas, AGAL defends that Galician and Portuguese are two varieties of the same language, in other words, two versions of the same diasystem. This view is based on the facts that Galician and Portuguese share an almost identical grammar, syntax, morphology, vocabulary and that natural mutual intelligibility is over ninety per cent.

Members of AGAL have been regularly present at the meetings of the CPLP (Community of Portuguese-Speaking Countries). In 2008, AGAL delegates were invited as speakers to the Portuguese Parliament when discussing the new spelling norms for Portuguese language.

Although AGAL was first founded under the auspices and guidance of Carvalho Calero, its first president was writer Xavier Alcalá (1981–82), followed by Maria do Carmo Henríquez Salido (1982–2001). The president from 2001 to 2007 was Bernardo Penabade. Alexandre Banhos held the presidency from June 2007 to May 2009, when he was replaced by president Valentim Rodrigues Fagim. From October 2012 to October 2015, Miguel Rodrigues Penas was the head of the association, and after him came the current president, Eduardo Maragoto.

Scientific and cultural production

AGAL has published a large number of titles on linguistics, Galician language and culture .

Since 1995 it has edited the quarterly Agália. Agália is in fact considered a reference journal in the domain of Galician and Portuguese culture and linguistics, although it also deals with a wide array of topics. Likewise, AGAL fosters the Universália, Criaçom, Música and Clássicos book collections. Through its web portal AGAL also provides for electronic publishing through GZ e-editora. The web portal also hosts an exhaustive dictionary, the e-Estraviz , among other free resources.

Support and opposition 
The orthographic reintegration campaign held by the AGAL is not supported by any of the Galician political parties currently represented in the Galician Parliament, although some members of parliament support it individually or express a sympathy towards its theoretical foundations.

AGAL has been accused by some of being closely linked to extreme-left minority groups. Indeed, such groups often use the AGAL orthography and some AGAL members may militate in them. However AGAL per se and as an institution has successfully managed to separate itself from any particular political camp and remain neutral, focusing only on the scientific aspects of linguistics.

See also
 Reintegrationism
 Carvalho Calero
 Galician language
 Portuguese language
 Galician-Portuguese
 Spelling reform
 Spelling reforms of Portuguese
 Community of Portuguese-Speaking Countries

Notes

Further reading
 AGAL (1983 and 1989): Estudo crítico das normas ortográficas e morfolóxicas do idioma galego. AGAL, Corunha
 AGAL (1985): Prontuário ortográfico galego. AGAL, Corunha
 Henríquez Salido, M. [ed.] et al. (1992): Actas do III Congresso Internacional da Língua Galego-Portuguesa na Galiza, 1990. AGAL, Corunha
 Henríquez Salido, M. [ed.] et al. (1996): Actas do IV Congresso Internacional da Língua Galego-Portuguesa na Galiza, 1993. AGAL, Corunha
 Penabade, B. (2001): "Xavier Alcalá escritor e primeiro presidente da AGAL", in Agália, no. 67/68, p. 193-222
 Souto Cabo, J.A. and Villarino Pardo, C. (2001): "As Dinámicas da AGAL através dos Congressos", in Agália, no. 67/68, p. 55-75

External links

Portal Galego da Língua
Revista Agália
 Ortografia Galega Moderna confluente com o Português no mundo (1ª edición, xaneiro de 2017)
 Estudo Crítico das Normas ILG-RAG (2ª edición, 1989)

Galician language
Portuguese language
Spelling reform
Language advocacy organizations
1981 establishments in Spain